The Mercure Perth Masters is an annual bonspiel, or curling tournament, that takes place at the Dewars Centre in Perth, Scotland. The tournament has been held in both a triple-knockout format and a round robin format. The tournament, started in 1971, and later became a part of the World Curling Tour (and has been since at least 2002). Curlers from outside Scotland have been dominant in this bonspiel.

The event has also been known as the Cream of the Barley Perth Masters (1986)  Stakis Masters at Perth (1994 & 1995), the Jarvis Masters @ Perth (2001), the Ramada Jarvis Masters @ Perth (2002) Ramada Jarvis Masters (2003) and the Ramada Perth Masters (2004-2011)

In 2020, the Women's World Curling Tour event, the City of Perth Ladies International, was renamed as the Mercure Perth Masters and will know be known under the new name.

Past champions

Men
Only skip's name is displayed.

Women

References

External links
Home Page
Dewars Centre Home

World Curling Tour events
Women's World Curling Tour events
Sport in Perth, Scotland
Curling in Scotland
Curling competitions in Scotland
Women's curling competitions in Scotland
Champions Curling Tour events
1971 establishments in Scotland
Recurring sporting events established in 1971